Tohfa is a 1984 Indian Hindi-language melodrama comedy film produced by D. Ramanaidu under the Suresh Productions banner and directed by K. Raghavendra Rao. It stars Jeetendra, Sridevi and Jaya Prada.  The film upon its release was a massive box office success, grossing , becoming the highest-grossing Indian film of 1984.

The film's narrative follows siblings Janki and Lalita who both fall for Ram, their good friend. When Lalita learns that Janki loves Ram, she steps back and allows her sister to marry him. It was a remake of Raghavendra Rao's Telugu blockbuster Devatha (1982), with Sridevi and Jaya Prada reprising their roles.

At the 32nd Filmfare Awards, Tohfa received three nominations: Best Comic Actor (Kapoor), Best Music and  Best Lyrics "Pyaar Ka Tohfa Tera."

Plot
Janaki (Jayaprada) and Lalita (Sridevi) are sisters who love each other dearly. Lalita and Ram (Jeetendra) fall passionately in love with each other. Unknown to them, Janaki is also in love with Ram. When Lalita finds out, she decides to sacrifice her relationship with Ram. In haste, she marries a good-for-nothing man (Shakti Kapoor), who is arrested by the police immediately afterward. Unaware of Lalita's true motive, Ram and Janaki are furious with her.

Lalita moves away and is not seen for several years. Ram and Janaki get married and live happily; their only sorrow is their inability to have children. Many years later, Ram meets Lalita again. She is working in an office and singlehandedly bringing up her son. To his shock, Ram realizes that he is the father of Lalita's son. The child had been conceived in a moment of passion between Ram and Lalita before they separated. Ram is torn between his loyalty to his wife Janaki and the pull of affection towards his son. Janaki, now expecting a child, finds out about her sister's reappearance but misunderstands the whole situation. She begins to suspect Ram and Lalita of cheating on her. However, at last, all the misunderstandings are cleared up. The true extent of Lalita's sacrifice becomes known to Janaki, who feel very guilty. Janaki gives birth to a daughter and passes away, leaving the baby and Ram in Lalita's care.

Cast
 Jeetendra as Ram
 Sridevi as Lalita 
 Jaya Prada as Janki
 Kader Khan as Raghuveer Singh
 Shakti Kapoor as Kaamesh Singh
 Asrani as Poojari
 Aruna Irani
 Jagdeep
 Leela Mishra as Dadi
 Mohan Choti as Jamoore

Soundtrack 
All songs are composed by Bappi Lahiri and lyrics are penned by Indeevar.
The song "Ek Aankh Maroon To" was renamed as "Bhankas" from the movie, Baaghi 3. The singers are sung by Dev Negi, Bappi Lahiri and Jonita Gandhi. The music is composed by Tanishk Bagchi.

Marketing and reception
Producer D. Rama Naidu employed huge billboards and cut outs for film's publicity before its release and managed to create considerable public interest. Upon its release, Tohfa was immediately noticed for its item number "Pyar Ka Tohfa Tera" picturised on Jaya Prada and "Ek Ankh Marun To", picturised on Sridevi sung by Asha Bhonsle, both of which became chartbusters.

Awards 
32nd Filmfare Awards:

Nominated

 Best Comedian – Shakti Kapoor
 Best Music Director – Bappi Lahiri
 Best Lyricist – Indeevar for "Tohfa Tere Pyaar Ka"

Legacy
The dialogue "Aaoo Lalita" used by Shakti Kapoor became popular and Kapoor named his restaurant after the dialogue in 2017.

References

External links
 

1984 films
1980s Hindi-language films
1984 romantic drama films
Hindi remakes of Telugu films
Films directed by K. Raghavendra Rao
Films scored by Bappi Lahiri
1980s masala films
Indian romantic drama films
Suresh Productions films